Soulcalibur is a weapon-based fighting game series by Namco Bandai Games. The series revolves around a sword that, after years of bloodshed and hatred, gained a soul of its own, the Soul Edge, and the sword forged to counter it, Soulcalibur. The discography of the Soulcalibur series consists of two soundtrack albums for the first game in the series, Soul Edge, and one soundtrack album each for Soulcalibur, Soulcalibur II, III, IV, V and VI.  None of the other games in the series have received a soundtrack release.

Music from the series was performed by a live orchestra at a concert at the Salle Pleyel in Paris in February 2017.

Super Battle Sound Attack Soul Edge

Super Battle Sound Attack Soul Edge is the soundtrack album for the arcade version of Soul Edge. It was composed by Namco employees Takayuki Aihara and Takanori Otsuka, with Aihara providing the majority of the tracks while Otsuka composed tracks 9, 11, 16, 20, and 25. Its 26 tracks have a duration of 42:24. The album was published by Media Remoras on September 20, 1996 with the catalog number of MRCA-20099, and reprinted by Pony Canyon a month later on October 21, 1996 with the catalog number PCCG-00365.

Soul Edge Original Soundtrack - Khan Super Session

Soul Edge Original Soundtrack - Khan Super Session is the soundtrack album for the PlayStation version of Soul Edge, which contained entirely different music than the arcade version, including "The Edge of Soul", which served as this version's main theme. It was composed by Masumi Itō (tracks 1, 3, 5, 7, 11, and 14), Benten Maru (2, 8, 10, and 16), Yoshiyuki Ito (6 and 12), Aki Hata (4), and Taku Iwasaki (9, 13 and 15). Its 16 tracks have a duration of 58:09. The album was published by BMG Japan on December 18, 1996 with the catalog number BVCH-732.

Soulcalibur Original Soundtrack

Soulcalibur Original Soundtrack is the soundtrack album for the second game in the Soul series, Soulcalibur. It was composed by Namco employees Junichi Nakatsuru, Yohihito Yano, Akitaka Tohyama, Takanori Otsuka, and Hideki Tobeta. Its 37 tracks span two discs and have a duration of 1:13:21. The second disc is only four tracks long, and contains two arrangements of tracks from the first disc made for the arcade version of the game as well as two additional arrangements. The album was published by Bandai Music Entertainment on October 21, 1999 with the catalog number APCG-9006.

Track list

Soulcalibur II Original Soundtrack

Soulcalibur II Original Soundtrack is the soundtrack album for the third game in the Soul series, Soulcalibur II. It was composed by Namco employees Junichi Nakatsuru, Yoshihito Yano, Asuka Sakai, Rio Hamamoto, Ryuichi Takada, and Junichi Takagi. Nakatsuru and Yano had also worked on the prequel's soundtrack. The album's 35 tracks span two discs and have a duration of 1:49:13. The album was published by DigiCube on March 26, 2003 with the catalog numbers SSCX-10086~7. 28 of the tracks were included in a CD distributed with the game's strategy guide in North America titled Soulcalibur II Limited Edition Strategy Guide Soundtrack on August 21, 2003. The Gamecube version of the game received an exclusive track that was a remix of The Legend of Zelda theme which played in Link's profile and Destined Battle.

Track list

Soulcalibur III Original Soundtrack

Soulcalibur III Original Soundtrack - Legend of Sounds is the soundtrack album for Soulcalibur III. It was composed by Namco employees Junichi Nakatsuru, Ryuichi Takada, and Keiki Kobayashi. Its 62 tracks span two discs and have a duration of 2:15:53. The album was published by Victor Entertainment on November 23, 2005 with the catalog number VIZL-158. Like the previous soundtrack in the series, a one-disc, 35-track version of the album was included in the North American strategy guide for the game. It was released on October 25, 2005.

Track list

Soulcalibur IV Original Soundtrack

Soulcalibur IV Original Soundtrack is the soundtrack album for Soulcalibur IV. It was composed by Namco employees Junichi Nakatsuru, Keiki Kobayashi, Masaharu Iwata, and Hiroyuki Fujita. Its 65 tracks span two discs and have a duration of 2:17:00. The album was published by Marvelous Entertainment on September 3, 2008 with the catalog number MJCD-20132. As with the previous two games in the series, a one-disc, 22-track version of the album was included in the North American strategy guide for the game. It was released on July 22, 2008. Three tracks from the Star Wars films accommodate the three guest characters: The Apprentice, Darth Vader, and Yoda. The tracks are "Duel of the Fates", "The Imperial March," "Qui-Gon's Noble End", and respectively.

Track list

Soulcalibur V Original Soundtrack

Soulcalibur V Original Soundtrack is the soundtrack album for Soulcalibur V. It was composed by Junichi Nakatsuru, Hiroki Kikuta, Tomoki Miyoshi, Andrew Aversa, Cris Velasco, Inon Zur, Jillian Aversa, and Jesper Kyd. Its 57 tracks span three discs and have a duration of 2:33:44. The album was published by Creative Intelligence Arts Records on January 31, 2012 with the catalog number SCV-0010112L. A one-disc, 17-track version of the album that included in the collector's edition game, was also released on January 31, 2012.

Track list

Soulcalibur VI Original Soundtrack

Soulcalibur VI Original Soundtrack is the soundtrack album for Soulcalibur VI. It was composed by Junichi Nakatsuru, Yoshihito Yano, Syuri Misaki, Yu Sugimoto, Rio Hamamoto, and Yukihiro Jindo. Its 71 tracks span four discs and a total length of 3:56:58. The album was published by SweepRecord on July 27, 2019 with the catalog number SRIN-1161.

Track list

References 

Discography
Video game music discographies

it:Soulcalibur#Colonna sonora